Lord George Bentinck (1715–1759) was a British Army officer and Member of Parliament (MP).

Biography
The second son of Henry Bentinck, 1st Duke of Portland, he received the appointment of ensign on 3 November 1735, and having been promoted on 12 April 1743 to the command of a company in the 1st Foot Guards, with the rank of lieutenant-colonel, he served at the battle of Dettingen in June that year. He obtained the appointment of aide-de-camp to the King on 12 March 1752, and the colonelcy of the 5th Regiment of Foot on 29 August 1754. He was afterwards promoted to the rank of major-general, and at the 1754 general election he was elected as the Member of Parliament for the borough of Malmesbury in Wiltshire. He died at Bath on 2 March 1759.

Bentinck was elected at by-election in 1742 as a Member of Parliament for the borough of Droitwich. At the next general election, in 1747, he was elected as an MP for the rotten borough Grampound. He held that seat until the 1754 general election, when he was elected for the borough of Malmesbury in Wiltshire. He held that seat until his death.

In 1753 he married Mary Davies at Keith's Chapel, Westminster.

References

1715 births
1759 deaths
George
Younger sons of dukes
Grenadier Guards officers
Royal Northumberland Fusiliers officers
British Army personnel of the War of the Austrian Succession
British Army major generals
Members of the Parliament of Great Britain for English constituencies
British MPs 1741–1747
British MPs 1747–1754
British MPs 1754–1761
Members of the Parliament of Great Britain for constituencies in Cornwall